Star Search 2007 is the 9th installment of Star Search. It marked the return of the talent-search program. From May 2007, Star Search 2007 travelled to China, Taiwan, Malaysia and Singapore in its search for new talents.

Auditions
Eager to be the next big thing, 1,500 people flocked to the auditions. Talent cuts across geographical boundaries and, as such, there is no restriction on the number to be shortlisted for each region.
The numbers are broken down this way:

Format
Two contestants will be removed from the talent quest each week, with no chance of a revival.
There will be four weeks of preliminary rounds, two weeks of quarter finals; one week of semi-final and grand final each.

Contestant information

Contestant mentors
Another new element this year is the introduction of MediaCorp artistes as mentors to the contestants. The responsibility of the artistes is to teach and they are also required to showcase the best qualities of their charges to the judges and audience.

Judges
In this 9th installment, the judging panel which will be made up of professionals from the industry. Moreover, this year the judges will have a 100% say over the eventual winners.

Judging criteria
Retaining its original format of a large-scale talent-search program, Star Search 2007 will incorporate new elements.

Awards and prizes

Ms Telegenic and Mr Personality subsidiary awards are decided by the judges.
Most Popular subsidiary award will be determined by public voting.

Episodic details

Episode 1 - Grand Debut (21 Aug 2007)
Gracing the occasion was Dr Balaji Sadasivan, the Senior Minister of State for Information, Communications and the Arts。

Episode 2 - Preliminary Round 1 (28 Aug 2007)
20 contestants remained in the competition at this stage.
5 female contestants competed in this episode.
2 will be eliminated.
3 contestants moved on to Quarter Final 1.

The talent segment will be set in a club in the 1920-30s and features MediaCorp actor Adam Chen as narrator.
The acting segment will also be set in the same era but will take place in a shopping street instead. 
MediaCorp actress Ng Hui will play a wealthy girl out shopping with her curry-favouring maid.

As the LAST TWO ranking were not shown, F4 and F1 assumed to be the 4th and 5th position respectively.

Episode 3 - Preliminary Round 2 (4 Sept 2007)
18 contestants remained in the competition at this stage.
5 male contestants competed in this episode.
2 will be eliminated.
3 contestants moved on to Quarter Final 1.

Both talent segment and acting segment will be set in the 1920-30s. 
MediaCorp veteran actor Liang Tian will be appearing in the talent segment.
As for the acting segment, the story is featuring 5 neighbors living under one roof in a building. 
MediaCorp actress Pan Lingling making a guest appearance as Jerry's shrewd wife.

Episode 4 - Preliminary Round 3 (11 Sept 2007)
16 contestants remained in the competition at this stage.
5 female contestants competed in this episode.
2 will be eliminated.
3 contestants moved on to Quarter Final 2.

Both talent segment and acting segment will be set in the 1940-50s.
The talent segment will feature a movie company interviewing for a movie actress with Star Search alumna Priscelia Chan making a guest appearance.
The acting segment will feature 5 students going on a field trip co-starring with MediaCorp actor Zhang Wen Xiang as their teacher.

Episode 5 - Preliminary Round 4 (18 Sept 2007)
14 contestants remained in the competition at this stage.
5 male contestants competed in this episode.
2 will be eliminated.
3 contestants moved on to Quarter Final 2.

Episode 6 - Quarter Final 1 (25 Sept 2007)
12 contestants remained in the competition at this stage.
3 male and female contestants will compete in this episode.
2 will be eliminated.
4 contestants moved on to Semi Final.

Episode 7 - Quarter Final 2 (2 Oct 2007)
10 contestants remained in the competition at this stage.
3 female and male contestants competed in this episode.
2 will be eliminated.
4 contestants moved on to Semi Final.

This week, the remaining contestants will travel back time to the colourful time in the 1970s.
Contestants will perform a song-and-dance item to the tunes of Beautiful Sunday and Qiao He which are hits songs back in the 1970s.

As for the acting segment, 3 contestants will act in a skit taking place at Feng Feng Cafe.
Skit 1 involves contestants F6 Lee Mei Leng, M4 Chang Hao Ying and M6 Jackson Tan. 
Quan Yi Fong guest-stars as the gossipy café boss Feng Jie.
Skit 2

Episode 8 - Star Search Prelude ( 9 Oct 2007)

Episode 9 - Semi Final ( 21 Oct 2007)
8 contestants remained in the competition at this stage.
4 female and male contestants competed in this episode.
2 will be eliminated.
6 contestants moved on to Grand Final.

Episode 10 - Grand Final (4 Nov 2007)
6 contestants remained in the competition at this stage.
2 female and 4 male contestants competed in the final.
5 will be eliminated.
1 will be crowned the champion.

Apart from the 10 mentors Zheng Geping, Huang Wenyong, Chen Liping, Chen Hanwei, Tay Ping Hui, Huang Biren, Ivy Lee, Hong Huifang, Edmund Chen and Rayson Tan, Star Search alumni Zoe Tay, Chew Chor Meng, Ix Shen, Felicia Chin, Vivian Lai, Yao Wenlong, Florence Tan, Jeff Wang, Aileen Tan, Brandon Wong, Chen Tianwen, Dennis Chew, Patricia Mok, Bryan Wong and Kym Ng attended the Grand Final. In addition, Taiwanese band Energy made a special guest appearance.

In this critical stage of the competition, the current panel will increase to a total of 6 judges. Besides the 3 resident judges, Taiwanese artiste Lang Tzu-yun, Hong Kong director Alfred Cheung and Senior Vice President of Chinese Drama Kok Len Shoong, Hong Kong actor Kenny Bee, local artiste Fann Wong and Deputy Group CEO (TV) Chang Long Jong will also be accessing the finalists in their performances.

There will also be three subsidiary awards for the six Finalists to compete in: Ms Telegenic Award, Mr Personality Award, and Most Popular Award

See also
Star Search 2003
Star Search Singapore

References

External links
Mediacorp Channel 8 Website
Star Search 2007 - Official Website
Star Search 2007 - Mediacorp English Forum
Star Search 2007 - Mediacorp Chinese Forum

2007 Singaporean television seasons